Camp Beauregard is a U.S. Army installation located northeast of Pineville, Louisiana, primarily in Rapides Parish, but also extending northward into Grant Parish. It is operated and owned by the Louisiana National Guard as one of their main training areas.

The camp was named for Louisiana native and Confederate General Pierre Gustave Toutant Beauregard. Camp Beauregard is one of ten U.S. Army installations named for former Confederate Generals.

The beginnings of the existing post date back to 1917, when the War Department authorized the building of more than thirty camps around the country to train troops for World War I. The 17th Division was organized in 1918 as a National Army division for World War I. The 17th Division included the 33rd Infantry Brigade (September 1918-February 1919), with the 5th and 83rd Regiments, and the 34th Brigade with the 29th and 84th Regiments. The 5th Infantry Regiment was assigned on 27 July 1918 to the 17th Division and relieved  on 10 February 1919. The 17th Division was intended to be a replacement and school division. The 17th Division did not go overseas and demobilized in February 1919 at Camp Beauregard. In 1919, the camp was abandoned and given to the state.

In 1940, Camp Beauregard was returned to the U.S. government for use as a World War II training area. During this time period Beauregard became very busy. The area had been effectively deforested in previous years and was unusable for agriculture. The camp, and several tens of thousands of acres of surrounding land, including Camp Claiborne, Camp Livingston, Camp Cook, Fort Polk and what is now Esler Regional Airport were used for the Louisiana Maneuvers, a training exercise involving almost 500,000 men, preparing for the battles of World War II.  Two-thirds of the U.S. military rotated through these war games. A large part of the State of Louisiana, centered on these large camps, became almost an occupied territory. After World War II, the camp was returned to the state, which used it as a training area for two years and then deactivated it.

In 1973, the camp was reactivated, and became one of the premier military training areas in Louisiana. Since then, most of the old buildings have either been torn down or remodeled, and many new buildings have been constructed.

The 256th Infantry Brigade Combat Team of the Louisiana Army National Guard often makes use of the Camp's training and lodging facilities.  The 225th Engineer Brigade, the largest engineer group in the army, has its headquarters in Camp Beauregard.  The 199th Regiment (RTI) is headquartered in Camp Beauregard as well.

The Louisiana Department of Public Safety & Corrections operated the J. Levy Dabadie Correctional Center adjacent to the Louisiana National Guard base on the camp property. until it closed in July 2012. The United States Marshals Service Tactical Operations Center maintains a small, full-time operational cadre of its Special Operations Group.

See also

References

Buildings and structures in Grant Parish, Louisiana
Buildings and structures in Rapides Parish, Louisiana
Installations of the United States Army National Guard
Military installations in Louisiana
P. G. T. Beauregard
United States Army posts
1917 establishments in Louisiana